Cilento, Vallo di Diano and Alburni National Park (Italian Parco Nazionale del Cilento, Vallo di Diano e Alburni) is an Italian national park in the Province of Salerno, in Campania in southern Italy. It includes much of the Cilento, the Vallo di Diano and the Monti Alburni. It was founded in 1991, and was formerly known as the Parco Nazionale del Cilento e Vallo di Diano.

History
The park was officially instituted on December 6, 1991 to protect the territory of Cilento from building speculation and mass tourism. Originally named Parco Nazionale del Cilento e Vallo di Diano, in 1998 it became a World Heritage Site of UNESCO, also with the ancient Greek towns of Paestum, Velia and the Padula Charterhouse.

The other natural reserves instituted in the area of the park are the "Natural reserve of Foce Sele-Tanagro" (created in 1993, with the Oasis of Persano) and the "Maritime reserve of Punta Licosa", in the municipality of Castellabate.

Geography
The national park's territory, one of the largest in Italy, does not include all the municipalities of the areas of Cilento and Vallo di Diano. It includes almost all the Cilentan Coast and its central forest area is Pruno. The administrative offices are located in Vallo della Lucania, at Piazza Santa Caterina nr. 8.

The municipalities part of the park are:

 Agropoli
 Aquara
 Ascea
 Auletta 
 Bellosguardo
 Buonabitacolo
 Camerota
 Campora
 Cannalonga
 Capaccio-Paestum
 Casalbuono
 Casal Velino
 Casaletto Spartano
 Caselle in Pittari
 Castel San Lorenzo
 Castelcivita
 Castellabate
 Castelnuovo Cilento
 Celle di Bulgheria
 Centola
 Ceraso
 Cicerale
 Controne
 Corleto Monforte
 Cuccaro Vetere
 Felitto
 Futani
 Gioi
 Giungano
 Laureana Cilento
 Laurino
 Laurito
 Lustra
 Magliano Vetere
 Moio della Civitella
 Montano Antilia
 Montecorice
 Monteforte Cilento
 Monte San Giacomo
 Montesano sulla Marcellana
 Morigerati
 Novi Velia
 Ogliastro Cilento
 Omignano
 Orria
 Ottati 
 Perdifumo
 Perito
 Petina
 Piaggine
 Pisciotta
 Polla
 Pollica
 Postiglione
 Prignano Cilento
 Roccadaspide
 Roccagloriosa
 Rofrano
 Roscigno
 Sacco
 Salento
 San Giovanni a Piro
 San Mauro Cilento
 San Mauro la Bruca
 San Pietro al Tanagro
 San Rufo
 Santa Marina
 Sant'Angelo a Fasanella
 Sant'Arsenio
 Sanza
 Sassano
 Serramezzana
 Sessa Cilento
 Sicignano degli Alburni
 Stella Cilento
 Stio
 Teggiano
 Torre Orsaia
 Torchiara
 Tortorella
 Trentinara
 Valle dell'Angelo
 Vallo della Lucania

Gallery

See also
Cilentan Coast
Castelcivita Caves
Pertosa Caves
Foce del Sele 
List of National Parks of Italy

References

External links

Official website  
Official pages by the Park Authority on Parks.it

National Park
National parks of Italy
Parks in Campania
World Heritage Sites in Italy
1991 establishments in Italy
Protected areas of the Apennines